The dusky gerygone (Gerygone tenebrosa) is a species of bird in the family Acanthizidae.
It is endemic to coastal central and northern areas of Western Australia.

Its natural habitat is subtropical or tropical mangrove forests.

References

dusky gerygone
Endemic birds of Western Australia
dusky gerygone
Taxonomy articles created by Polbot